Stary Folwark may refer to the following places:
Stary Folwark, Greater Poland Voivodeship (west-central Poland)
Stary Folwark, Kuyavian-Pomeranian Voivodeship (north-central Poland)
Stary Folwark, Podlaskie Voivodeship (north-east Poland)
Stary Folwark, Warmian-Masurian Voivodeship (north Poland)